Grainville-sur-Odon (literally Grainville on Odon) is a commune in the Calvados department in the Normandy region in northwestern France.

Population

See also
Grainville-Langannerie
Communes of the Calvados department
Operation Epsom

References

External links

Official site

Communes of Calvados (department)
Calvados communes articles needing translation from French Wikipedia